Padideh (پدیده) is a Persian girl's name meaning "phenomenon".

Padideh F.C.  Iranian football club based in Mashhad, also called Padide
Padideh Bolourizadeh 1974  Iranian track and field athlete and volleyball player
Padideh Shandiz Iranian private joint-stock holding company active in restaurants
Padideh Jalali, Ph.D. CEO of UpperMark, Inc., specializing in alternative investments and CAIA exam study resources.